The Central Bookstore is a bookstore in Central District, Taichung, Taiwan.

History

Empire of Japan
The bookstore was originally opened on 3 January 1927 by Taiwanese Cultural Association as a meeting venue for pro-democracy and self-rule movement as a branch of the Central Club. The first and second floor housed selected Mainland Chinese, Japanese and Western books. It also served as the venue for the public to learn about writer Lu Xun and Ba Jin after the May Fourth Movement on 4 May 1919 in Peking. Later the shop caught attention of the government and it was then placed under heavy surveillance.

Republic of China
After the handover of Taiwan from Japan to the Republic of China in 1945, the shop finally resumed to its normal operation. In the same year, it was later moved to its current building on Taiwan Boulevard which it was used to be used as the store dormitory and warehouse. In 1998, the store was closed due to financial difficulties. Since then, it had been used as wedding dress shop, convenience store and motorcycle helmet store. In 2016, the rights to use the building was obtained by Shang Shan Human Culture Foundation. Since then, the building was renovated and restored as a bookstore again with a cost of NT$20 million. The bookshop was reopened for trial in November 2019 and on 18 October 2020, it was officially reopened in a ceremony attended by Culture Minister Lee Yung-te

Architecture
The bookstore is housed in a 3-story building with a circular shape.

Transportation
The bookstore is accessible within walking distance northeast of Taichung Station of Taiwan Railways.

See also
 Taiwanese literature

References

1927 establishments in Taiwan
Bookstores of Taiwan
Buildings and structures in Taichung